Dayton Public Schools is the school district in the U.S. state of Ohio that serves Dayton, Ohio. The district covers 49 square miles. Dayton Public Schools (DPS) is the 12th largest PreK-12 district in the state, with a 2017–2018 enrollment of about 12571. DPS has 28 schools, 18 PreK-8 schools, 2 middle schools, 6 high schools, and 2 special centers.

DPS operates the FM jazz radio station WDPS.

Schools

High schools (9-12 & 7-12)

Elementary and middle schools (Pre-K-8)
 Belle Haven Pre-K-8 School
 Charity Adams Early Girls Academy Pre-K-8
 Cleveland Elementary Pre-K-6 School
 Dayton Boys Prep Academy
 E.J.Brown Pre-K-8 School
 Eastmont Pre-K-8 School
 Edison Pre-K-8 School/middle school 7-8
 Fairview Pre-K-8 School
 Horace Mann Pre-K-8 School
 Kemp Pre-K-6 School
 Kiser Pre-K-8 School – At the site of former Kiser High School
 Louise Troy Pre-K-4 School
 Meadowdale Pre-K-8 School
 Wright Brothers PreK-8 School
 River's Edge Montessori Pre-K-6 School
 Rosa Parks Early Learning Center
 Ruskin Pre-K-8 School
 Valerie Pre-K-6 School
 Westwood Pre-K-8 School
 Wogaman 5-8 School
 World of Wonder Pre-K-8 School at Residence Park

Special centers
Longfellow Alternative Learning Center

Former school buildings 
The following schools have been closed and, in some cases, demolished.

High schools

Elementary schools
Allen Elementary School
Bauer Elementary School
Belmont Elementary School
Beverly Gardens Elementary School
Blairwood Elementary School
Brantwood Elementary School
Brown Elementary School
Carlson Elementary School
Central Elementary School
Cornell Heights Elementary School
Dorothy Lane Elementary School
Drexel Elementary School
Driscoll Elementary School
Emerson Elementary School
Fairport Elementary School
Fort McKinley Elementary School
Franklin Montessori School
Gardendale Elementary School
Garfield Elementary School
Gettysburg Elementary School
Green Elementary School
Harman Elementary School
Harshman Elementary School
Hawthorne Elementary School
Hickorydale Elementary School
Highview Elementary School
Hole Elementary School
Holliday Elementary School
Huffman Elementary School
Irving Elementary School
Jackson Elementary School
Jackson Primary School
Jane Addams Elementary School
Jefferson Elementary School
Kennedy Elementary School
Lincoln Elementary School
Loos Elementary School
Miami Chapel
MacFarlane School
McGuffey Elementary School
Patterson Kennedy Elementary School
Shiloh Elementary School
Shoup Mill Elementary School
Van Cleve Elementary School
Orville Wright Elementary School
Willard Elementary School
Westwood Elementary School
McNary Park Elementary School
Residence Park ElementarySchool
Webster Elementary School
Whittier Elementary School

See also
List of school districts in Ohio
Dayton City League

References

External links
Official website

Education in Dayton, Ohio
School districts in Ohio